Richard Lee Zumwalt Jr. (September 24, 1951 – March 19, 2003) was an American professional arm-wrestler and actor. He is known for playing the character of Bob "Bull" Hurley in the 1987 Sylvester Stallone movie Over the Top.

Career
In addition to his role in Over the Top, Zumwalt appeared in several other films. In 1988, he had a small but memorable role fighting Sean Connery in a bar in The Presidio. In 1992, he played a tattooed strongman, one of the Penguin's henchmen, in Batman Returns.

Zumwalt also appeared on TV. He co-starred as "Judge Mental" on the kids' gameshow Pictionary and also had a supporting role in a 1990 episode of Night Court. 

In the mid-1990s, Zumwalt began appearing as a strongman in the popular theatrical production Cirque du Soleil.

Zumwalt became an alcoholic in his early thirties. Ten years later, he became an active member in a clean and sober fellowship and spent a great deal of time and effort serving others suffering from substance abuse.

Death
According to his former wife, he died on March 19, 2003, after suffering a major heart attack.

Partial filmography
Over the Top (1987) - Bob "Bull" Hurley
Disorderlies (1987) - Huge Cop
Penitentiary III (1987) - Joshua
The Presidio (1988) - Bully in Bar
The Big Turnaround (1988) - Turk
Criminal Act (1989) - Tiny
Liberty & Bash (1989) - Ace
Rockula (1990) - Boom Boom
Ragin' Cajun (1990) - Lou
Perfect Strangers (1990)
Missing Pieces (1991) - Mountain Man
Prime Target (1991) - Potsy
Under Surveillance (1991) - Doorman
Batman Returns (1992) - Tattooed Strongman
Father Hood (1993) - Burly Guy
Full House (1993) - Leonard Schulz (Season 7, episode 11: "The Bicycle Thief") 
In Quiet Night (1998) - Prisoner
I Love You, But (1998) - Coach Andrews
Skippy (2001) - Biker with Bandana (final film role)

References

External links
 Biography Brief biography
 
 TV Guide.com: Rick Zumwalt

1951 births
2003 deaths
American male film actors
People from Desert Hot Springs, California
Sportspeople from Riverside County, California
20th-century American male actors